Phlegmacium cremeiamarescens is a species of fungus in the family Cortinariaceae.

Taxonomy 
It was originally described in 2014 by the mycologists  Ilkka Kytövuori, Kare Liimatainen and Tuula Niskanen who classified it as Cortinarius cremeiamarescens. It was placed in the (subgenus Phlegmacium) of the large mushroom genus Cortinarius.

In 2022 the species was transferred from Cortinarius and reclassified as Phlegmacium cremeiamarescens based on genomic data.

Etymology 
The specific epithet cremeiamarescens refers to the fruitbody colour and the bitter-tasting cap cuticle. Phlegmacium gentianeus is a sister species with which it has been previously confused.

Habitat and distribution 
Found in southern Europe and western North America, where it grows in coniferous forests.

See also

List of Cortinarius species

References

External links

cremeiamarescens
Fungi described in 2014
Fungi of Europe